One Away may refer to:

 One Away, a pricing game on The Price Is Right
 One Away (film), a 1976 American action film